Turkey Creek (also called Turkey Branch) is a stream in Monroe County in the U.S. state of Missouri. It is a tributary of Elk Fork Salt River.

Turkey Creek was so named on account of wild turkeys near its course.

See also
List of rivers of Missouri

References

Rivers of Monroe County, Missouri
Rivers of Missouri